Epicyrtica metallica is a moth of the family Erebidae first described by Thomas Pennington Lucas in 1898. It is found in Australia.

References

Calpinae
Moths of Australia
Moths described in 1898